Kingmoor is a civil parish in the Carlisle district of Cumbria, England.  It contains seven listed buildings that are recorded in the National Heritage List for England.  All the listed buildings are designated at Grade II, the lowest of the three grades, which is applied to "buildings of national importance and special interest".  The parish contains the villages of Stainton and Cargo, and is otherwise rural.  The listed buildings consist of farmhouses, farm buildings, private houses, and a boathouse.


Buildings

References

Citations

Sources

Lists of listed buildings in Cumbria